Langenbach station is a railway station in the municipality of Langenbach, district of Freising in the northeast area of Munich, Germany.

References

External links

Railway stations in Bavaria
Railway stations in Germany opened in 1858
1858 establishments in Bavaria
Buildings and structures in Freising (district)